The Dutch Single Distance Championships of speed skating, organised by the KNSB, is the official Dutch championship to determine the Dutch champion over a single distance, in contrast to the KNSB Dutch Allround Championships, which determine the Dutch allround champion. The single distance championships date back to 1987, and is often used as qualification races for World Cup and Olympic races. The skaters compete for medals in the five Olympic distances: 500, 1000, 1500, 3000 (women only), 5000 and 10,000 (men only) metres.

List of champions

Source: Schaatsstatistieken.nl, KNSB.nl 

Source: Schaatsstatistieken.nl, KNSB.nl

Notes

References

Dutch Speed Skating Championships
Speed skating in the Netherlands